Calwood is an unincorporated community in Callaway County, in the U.S. state of Missouri. The community lies at the intersection of Missouri Routes JJ and Z approximately one mile south of I-70. Fulton is about six miles to the southwest on Route Z. Auxvasse Creek flows past approximately one mile to the northeast.

History
A post office called Calwood was established in 1874, and remained in operation until 1922. The community's name is an amalgamation of the names of Cal James and Edward Wood.

References

Unincorporated communities in Callaway County, Missouri
Unincorporated communities in Missouri
Jefferson City metropolitan area